The Atlanta Sharks were a professional indoor football team based in Loganville, Georgia. They were members of American Indoor Football (AIF) during the 2014 and 2015 seasons. The Sharks joined the AIF in 2013 as an expansion team, by then owner Betty Chaney-Robinson. The Sharks played all of their games on the road as a travel team.

History
The Sharks were announced as an expansion member of American Indoor Football (AIF) on September 6, 2013. On November 19, 2013, Marcus James was officially named the team's first head coach.
In the franchise's first ever game, they were defeated 87-32 by the Cape Fear Heroes.

The Sharks started the 2015 season having agreed to play their home games at Creekside Sports Center in Loganville, Georgia. However, when the Sharks were supposed to host the Saginaw Sting during Week 2 of the season, the game was postponed to Week 10.

The Sharks were listed in the 2016 schedule of the Indoor Football Alliance but were not included in the alliance's inaugural draft.

Coaches of note

Head coaches

Coaching staff

Statistics and records

Season-by-season results
Note: The finish, wins, losses, and ties columns list regular season results and exclude any postseason play.

References

External links
 Official website

 
Former American Indoor Football teams
American football teams established in 2013
American football teams in Georgia (U.S. state)